This is a list of the National Register of Historic Places listings in Chippewa County, Michigan.

This is intended to be a complete list of the properties and districts on the National Register of Historic Places in Chippewa County, Michigan, United States. Latitude and longitude coordinates are provided for many National Register properties and districts; these locations may be seen together in a map.

There are 28 properties and districts listed on the National Register in the county.



|}

See also

 National Register of Historic Places listings in Michigan
 Listings in neighboring counties: Luce, Mackinac, Presque Isle
List of Michigan State Historic Sites in Chippewa County, Michigan

References

Chippewa County